Michael Seaton (born 1 May 1996) is a Jamaican professional footballer who plays for German fourth tier side Berliner AK 07. Upon his MLS debut with D.C. United in 2013, he became the league's first player born after it began play.

Youth
Born in Spanish Town, Jamaica, Seaton began playing for D.C. United in 2010, when he signed for their youth academy, as part of the U-15 squad. Before playing for D.C. United, he played for the Freestate Soccer Alliance, a soccer club based in Bowie, Maryland. He worked his way up the ranks of the academy.

Professional career

United States 
In 2009–10, Seaton started his soccer career by playing with his middle school team, Nicholas Orem Middle School. With the help of his coach, Mr. Winston Miller, Seaton tried out for the D.C. United Youth Academy. Seaton signed with D.C. United on 13 January 2013. Seaton was the fifth member of United's Academy to sign a contract with the first team.

In March 2013, he was loaned to the Richmond Kickers of USL Pro. On 3 May, Seaton made his debut for Richmond against Wilmington, where he scored.

Seaton's first game with D.C. United was a friendly match on 12 July 2013, against C.D. Guadalajara. Seaton played for 20 minutes and assisted Carlos Ruiz's goal in the 73rd minute. He made his first MLS start on 28 September 2013, against Toronto FC. Seaton trained with Serie A club Internazionale during January 2014.  He played five MLS games in total for DC United.

On 6 August 2015, Seaton was traded to Portland Timbers. He was waived by the club on 13 May 2016.

Örebro SK 
On 31 March 2015, Örebro SK presented Seaton as their player, joining the Swedish team on a loan deal. On 4 June, Örebro SK announced that they cancelled the loan deal with Seaton and that he would return to D.C. United.

Israel 
In July 2016, Seaton signed with Israel second division club Hapoel Ramat Gan. On 26 January 2017, Seaton was loaned to Hapoel Tel Avi, and returned on 30 June 2017.

On 3 September 2017, Seaton joined Maccabi Ahi Nazareth.

Orange County SC 
In March 2018, Seaton signed with Orange County SC in the USL. In 29 appearances for the club, he scored 15 goals and tallied seven assists, including a playoff hat trick against Saint Louis FC on 20 October. Just four days later, Seaton agreed to terms with Orange County SC to remain with the club for the 2019 season.

Seaton scored Orange County's first goal of 2019 after intercepting an errant back pass as his side fought back from a 2–0 deficit to draw 2–2 on 9 March. On 4 May, just four days after his 23rd birthday, the striker scored the winning goal against rival side Phoenix Rising FC. On 24 July, Seaton surpassed former teammate Thomas Enevoldsen to become Orange County SC's all-time leading goalscorer. Seaton finished 2019 with 13 goals and five assists in 31 appearances. In November 2019, Seaton announced his departure from Orange County SC.

Viktoria Köln 
In January 2020, Seaton joined FC Viktoria Köln in a free transfer.

International career
Seaton received his first senior Jamaica national team call versus Trinidad on 15 November 2013. Seaton scored his 1st senior international goal versus St. Lucia on 5 March 2014, as a 17-year-old.

International goals
Scores and results list Jamaica's goal tally first, score column indicates score after each Seaton goal.

Personal life
Seaton also holds U.S. citizenship.

Honours
Portland Timbers
MLS Cup: 2015
Western Conference (playoffs): 2015

Orange County SC
 USL Western Conference Regular Season Champion: 2018

Jamaica
Caribbean Cup: 2014

References

External links
 
 
 TopDrawerSoccer Profile
 

1996 births
Living people
People from Spanish Town
Jamaican footballers
Jamaica international footballers
Jamaica under-20 international footballers
Jamaica youth international footballers
Association football forwards
D.C. United players
Richmond Kickers players
Örebro SK players
Portland Timbers players
Portland Timbers 2 players
Hapoel Ramat Gan F.C. players
Hapoel Tel Aviv F.C. players
Maccabi Ahi Nazareth F.C. players
Orange County SC players
FC Viktoria Köln players
BSV Schwarz-Weiß Rehden players
Berliner AK 07 players
USL Championship players
Major League Soccer players
Allsvenskan players
Liga Leumit players
3. Liga players
Regionalliga players
Jamaican expatriate footballers
Jamaican expatriate sportspeople in the United States
Expatriate soccer players in the United States
Expatriate footballers in Sweden
Jamaican expatriate sportspeople in Sweden
Jamaican expatriate sportspeople in Israel
Expatriate footballers in Israel
Jamaican expatriate sportspeople in Germany
Expatriate footballers in Germany
2014 Caribbean Cup players
2015 CONCACAF U-20 Championship players
2015 CONCACAF Gold Cup players
Homegrown Players (MLS)